The CAFA Women's Futsal Championship is an international futsal competition in Central Asia for the member nations of the Central Asian Football Association (CAFA).

Seniors

Results

Performance by nations

* = hosts

Comprehensive team results by tournament
Legend
 – Champions
 – Runners-up
 – Third place
 – Fourth place
Q – Qualified for upcoming tournament
 – Did not qualify
 – Did not enter / Withdrew / Banned
 – Hosts

For each tournament, the number of teams (in brackets) are shown.

Overall team records
Teams are ranked by total points, then by goal difference, then by goals scored.

Under-age tournaments

U-19 Women's futsal

References

External links 

 CAFA

CAFA competitions
Futsal competitions in Asia
2022 establishments in Asia